South Danbury Christian Church is a historic church at 675 US 4 in Danbury, New Hampshire.  Built in 1867, it is a little-altered and well-preserved example of a rural vernacular church.  The building was listed on the National Register of Historic Places in 1985.

Description and history
The South Danbury Christian Church is located in the rural village of South Danbury, on the east side of US 4 just north of its junction with Challenge Hill Road.  It is a single-story wood-frame structure, with a gabled roof and clapboarded exterior.  A gabled entry pavilion projects from the front facade, which is unadorned except for the entry and pedimented gable.  The entry is a double-leaf door, flanked by sidelight windows and framed by simple moulding.  Astride the main block and entry pavilion, a single-stage square tower rises to a flat top with corner pinnacles and a low balustrade.  The interior is simply appointed, with carpeted floors, plaster walls with wide board wainscoting, and a pressed metal ceiling.

The building was constructed in 1867 by the local congregational society, which had been established the previous year.  It was built by a local contractor, funds raised by the sale of pews.   It has undergone relatively little exterior modification since.  It has limited ornamentation, and is a good example of a rural vernacular 19th century church building.  The only exterior changes of note are the replacement of the roof (1974), and the addition of electric lighting and a handrail.  Interior changes were made around the turn of the 20th century, most of which are not detailed in church records.

See also
National Register of Historic Places listings in Merrimack County, New Hampshire

References

United Church of Christ churches in New Hampshire
Churches on the National Register of Historic Places in New Hampshire
Churches completed in 1867
19th-century United Church of Christ church buildings
Churches in Merrimack County, New Hampshire
National Register of Historic Places in Merrimack County, New Hampshire
Danbury, New Hampshire